Justinus or Justin Heinrich Knecht (30 September 1752 – 1 December 1817) was a German composer, organist, and music theorist.

Biography
He was born in Biberach an der Riss, where he learnt to play the organ, keyboard, violin, and singing. He attended a Lutheran collegiate institution in Esslingen am Neckar from 1768 to 1771, when he became Lutheran preceptor and music director in Biberach, which was a free imperial city until 1803, and had a rich cultural life. He became organist of St Martin's church in 1792, which was used simultaneously by Lutherans and Catholics.

He led an energetic, busy musical life; he composed for the theatre and church, organised subscription concerts, and taught music theory, acoustics, aesthetics, composition, and instruments at the Gymnasium, which was affiliated to the Musikschule in 1806. He went to Stuttgart in December 1806 in the hopes of a post there as Kapellmeister or similar, but after being appointed Direktor beim Orchester by the King of Württemberg in April 1807, he returned in 1808 to his former life in Biberach where he remained for the rest of his life.

Works
Collections are in the Wieland-Archiv, Biberach, and the Kick collection at the library of University of Tübingen. A full thematic catalogue is in Ladenburger (1984).

Vocal
Psalm XXIII (Leipzig, 1783)
Psalm VI (Speyer, 1788)
Magnificat (1790–1791)
Psalm I (Speyer, 1792)
Herr Gott, dich loben wir (Stuttgart, 1816), on Luther's ""
Vollständige Sammlung ... vierstimmiger Choralmelodien für das neue wirtembergische Landesgesangbuch, ed. Knecht and J.F. Christmann (Stuttgart, 1799)
Dixit Dominus (1800) 
10 cantatas (c. 1800)
Te Deum (Offenbach, 1801)
Wechselgesang der Mirjam und Debora (F.G. Klopstock: Der Messias) (Leipzig, 1781)

Opera and stage
Die treuen Köhler (operetta, G.E. Heermann), 1786
Jupiter und Ganymed (prologue and epilogue), 1783
Die Entführung aus dem Serail (comic opera, C.F. Bretzner), 1787
Der lahme Husar (comic opera, F. Koch), 1788
Der Schulz im Dorfe, oder der verliebte Herr Doctor (comic opera, C.L. Dieter), 1789
Der Kohlenbrenner (Lustspiel mit Gesang, L. Ysenburg von Buri), 1789
Der Musenchor (prologue, Knecht), 1791
Die Glocke (melodrama, F. Schiller), 1807
Die Aeolsharfe, oder Der Triumph der Musik und Liebe (romantic opera, N. Remmele), 1807–1808
Feodore (singspiel, A. von Kotzebue), 1812
Ubaldo (incidental music, Kotzebue), 1818

Orchestral
Le portrait musical de la nature, ou Grande sinfonie (Pastoralsymphonie) (Speyer, 1784–1785), modern edition by H.W. Höhnen in The Symphony 1720–1840, series C, XIII (New York, 1984) - this work was much admired and anticipates the programme of Beethoven's Pastoral Symphony

Chamber
Sonata, for harpsichord, violin and cello ad libitum (Speyer, 1790)
3 Duos, for 2 flutes (Speyer, 1791)
Diverses danses, for piano/(flute and guitar) (Mainz, 1817)

Organ
Neue vollständige Sammlung ... für ... Klavier- und Orgelspieler (Speyer 1791–1795)
Die durch ein Donnerwetter unterbrochne Hirtenwonne (Darmstadt, 1794), modern edition by H.W. Höhnen (Wiesbaden, 1982)
90 kurze und leichte neue Orgelstücke (Augsburg, 1794)
Vollständige Orgelschule (Leipzig, 1795–1798/1989) - Ludwig van Beethoven owned a copy of this work
Sammlung progressiver Orgelstücke (Biberach, 1805)
Königlich württembergisches ... Choralbuch (Stuttgart, 1816)
Caecilia (Freiburg, 1817–19)

He completed J. S. Bach's The Art of Fugue (1803), but this has been lost.

Piano
12 variationen (Leipzig, 1785)
Kleine praktische Klavierschule (Munich, 1799–1802)
Kleine theoretische Klavierschule (Munich, 1800–1801)
Bewährtes Methodenbuch beim ersten Klavierunterricht (Freiburg, 1820)

Theoretical
In music theory, he agreed with the ideas of G.J. Vogler.

Erklärung einiger … missverstandenen Grundsätze aus der Voglerschen Theorie (Ulm, 1785)
Gemeinnützliches Elementarwerk der Harmonie und des Generalbasses, part 1 (Speyer, 1792), parts 2–4 (Stuttgart, 1793–1797)
Kleines alphabetisches Wörterbuch der vornehmsten und interessantesten Artikel aus der musikalischen Theorie (Ulm, 1795)
Knechts allgemeiner musikalischer Katechismus (Biberach, 1803)
Luthers Verdienste um Musik und Poesie (Ulm, 1817)
Theoretisch-praktische Generalbassschule (Freiburg, c.1817)

Selected Recordings
 Die Äolsharfe dir. Frieder Bernius.
 Le portrait musical de la nature, ou Grande sinfonie dir. Frieder Bernius.
 Le Portrait Musical de la Nature, dir. Bernhard Forck Akademie für Alte Musik Berlin.

Sources

Michael Ladenburger: 'Knecht, Justin Heinrich', Grove Music Online ed. L. Macy (Accessed 2007-06-13), http://www.grovemusic.com/

Further reading
Lebensbeschreibung Herrn Justin Heinrich Knecht, evangelischen Schullehrers und Musikdirektors der freien Reichstadt Biberach, in Musikalische Real-Zeitung (10 February 1790, 17 February 1790, 24 February 1790)
F. Schlegel: Justinus Heinrich Knecht (Biberach, 1980)
'M. Ladenburger: Justin Heinrich Knecht: Leben und Werk: thematisch-bibliographisches Verzeichnis seiner Kompositionen (dissertation, University of Vienna, 1984)
J. Eppelsheim: Justin Heinrich Knechts 'Orgelschule' als Zeugnis süddeutscher Vorstellungen von Orgelklang und Orgelspiel um 1800, in Beiträge zu Orgelbau und Orgelmusik in Oberschwaben im 18. Jahrhundert (Ochsenhausen, 1988)
H. Musch: Zu den Cantabile-Stücken in der Orgelschule von Justin Heinrich Knecht, in Beiträge zu Orgelbau und Orgelmusik in Oberschwaben im 18. Jahrhundert (Ochsenhausen, 1988)
H.M. Miller: Die Orgelwerke von Justin Heinrich Knecht (Munich, 1990)
H. Jung: Zwischen Malerey und Empfindung: zu den historischen und Ausdruck der ästhetischen Voraussetzungen von Justin Heinrich Knechts Le portrait musical de la nature (1785), in Studien zur Musikgeschichte: eine Festschrift für Ludwig Finscher, ed. A. Laubenthal and K. Kusan-Windweh (Kassel, 1995)

External links

 
 
 

1752 births
1817 deaths
18th-century keyboardists
19th-century German male musicians
German Classical-period composers
German male classical composers
German opera composers
German classical organists
German male organists
German music theorists
Male opera composers
People from Biberach an der Riss
Male classical organists